The Neutor may refer to:

 Neutor (Salzburg), a road tunnel and gate in Salzburg, Austria
 , a city gate in Nürnberg, Germany